Amauroderma calcigenum is a polypore fungus in the family Ganodermataceae. It was first described as a species of Polyporus by Miles Joseph Berkeley in 1843. Camille Torrend transferred it to genus Amauroderma in 1920. A. calcigenum is found in Brazil, Guyana, and Venezuela.

References

calcigenum
Fungi described in 1843
Fungi of South America
Taxa named by Miles Joseph Berkeley